Orkney Library and Archive is a Scottish public library service based in Kirkwall, Orkney. Founded in 1683, Orkney Library is the oldest public library in Scotland. Its rules date from 1815. It has become known for its popular, humorous Twitter account.

History 
The Orkney Library and Archive was founded in 1683 with a bequest of 150 books from William Baikie. The collection was kept at the local manse before being transferred to St Magnus Cathedral. In 1740 the collection was moved to the Old Tollboth. In 1815 a number of subscribers to the collection founded The Orkney Library. The library was a subscription-only service until 1890 when a donation from Andrew Carnegie allowed the library to adopt the 1850 Public Libraries Act. A further donation was made by Carnegie in 1903 for a dedicated building. The new Carnegie Library opened on Laing Street in Kirkwall in 1909. The current library building on Junction Road, Kirkwall opened in August 2003.

Archive 

The Archive was established in 1973. The collection includes local history and genealogical records, photographs, sound recordings, and film. The collection also includes letters from William Galloway to Sir Henry Dryden. The Archive service was awarded accreditation in November 2017.

Services 
The Library offers access to over 145,000 items, including fiction and non-fiction titles, audiobooks, maps, eBooks, music CDs and DVDs.

Twitter presence 
The Library enjoys a good-natured and well publicised Twitter feud with Shetland Library. J.K. Rowling paid a surprise trip to the library book group in 2016.

References

External links

Public libraries in Scotland
Archives in Scotland
Carnegie libraries in Scotland
Education in Orkney
Kirkwall